The men's 4 × 10 kilometre relay cross-country skiing event was part of the cross-country skiing at the 1936 Winter Olympics programme. It was the first appearance of the event. The competition was held on Monday, 10 February 1936. Sixty-four cross-country skiers from 16 nations competed.

Medalists

Results

References

External links
Official Olympic Report
 

Men's 4 x 10 kilometre relay
Men's 4 × 10 kilometre relay cross-country skiing at the Winter Olympics